Golden Grove is a census-designated place (CDP) in Greenville County, South Carolina, United States. The population was 2,467 at the 2010 census. It is part of the Greenville–Mauldin–Easley Metropolitan Statistical Area.

Geography
It is bordered to the south and west by the unincorporated community of Piedmont. The western edge of Golden Grove follows the Saluda River, which is the border with Anderson County.

The main road through Golden Grove is South Carolina Highway 20, which leads north  to Greenville and south through Piedmont  to Belton. Interstate 185 passes through the northern part of Golden Grove, crossing SC 20 at Exit 10. I-185 leads north  to Interstate 85 and east  to Interstate 385, forming part of a loop around the southern suburbs of Greenville.

Demographics

As of the census of 2000, there were 2,348 people, 914 households, and 687 families residing in the CDP. The population density was 402.0 people per square mile (155.2/km2). There were 977 housing units at an average density of 167.3/sq mi (64.6/km2). The racial makeup of the CDP was 82.07% White, 15.93% African American, 0.09% Native American, 0.60% Asian, 0.09% Pacific Islander, 0.17% from other races, and 1.06% from two or more races. Hispanic or Latino of any race were 0.77% of the population.

There were 914 households, out of which 33.3% had children under the age of 18 living with them, 58.9% were married couples living together, 12.4% had a female householder with no husband present, and 24.8% were non-families. 20.7% of all households were made up of individuals, and 7.2% had someone living alone who was 65 years of age or older. The average household size was 2.57 and the average family size was 2.96.

In the CDP, the population was spread out, with 25.2% under the age of 18, 7.5% from 18 to 24, 31.2% from 25 to 44, 23.9% from 45 to 64, and 12.2% who were 65 years of age or older. The median age was 37 years. For every 100 females, there were 93.4 males. For every 100 females age 18 and over, there were 88.6 males.

The median income for a household in the CDP was $41,447, and the median income for a family was $50,670. Males had a median income of $32,286 versus $24,451 for females. The per capita income for the CDP was $17,737. About 6.0% of families and 8.0% of the population were below the poverty line, including 8.1% of those under age 18 and 15.6% of those age 65 or over.

References

Census-designated places in Greenville County, South Carolina
Census-designated places in South Carolina
Upstate South Carolina